Baron Palumbo may refer to:

Peter Palumbo, Baron Palumbo,(born 1935), British property developer, art collector, and former chairman of the Arts Council of Great Britain
James Palumbo, Baron Palumbo of Southwark, (born 1963), British entrepreneur, author, and co-founder of the Ministry of Sound nightclub

Noble titles created in 1991